Kaspar Jancis (born 8 May 1975) is an Estonian director of animated films, musician, composer.

Kaspar Jancis was born in Tallinn as the son of Latvian pianist  and Estonian ballet master, dancer and screenwriter Mai Murdmaa. Jancis' brother  is a professional musician. He studied at Tallinn University and at Turku Arts and Media School, learning filmmaking.

He has published one children's book:  ('Morten on a Ship of Fools'; 2010).

Films
  (1997)
  (1997)
  (1999)
  (2002)
 Frank ja Wendy (with Priit Tender, Ülo Pikkov and Priit Pärn; 2003–2005)
  (2006)
 Captain Morten and the Spider Queen (2018)

References

1975 births
Living people
Estonian animated film directors
Estonian film directors
Estonian rock musicians
20th-century Estonian musicians
Estonian male writers
21st-century Estonian writers
Estonian children's writers
Tallinn University alumni
Estonian people of Latvian descent
People from Tallinn
Musicians from Tallinn